U.Jimshad (born 10 June 1987) is an Indian football player who last played for Gokulam Kerala FC of the I-League as a forward.

Personal life
Jimshad Completed his BA Degree Economics from M.E.S College Mampad in 2010.

Career
He Started Playing Sevens Football Tournaments and established as a player in College Level. In 2009, he Played for Chennai State Bank team.

Career statistics

References

External links
U Jimshad at Goal.com

1987 births
Living people
Indian footballers
I-League players
Chirag United Club Kerala players
Footballers from Kerala
People from Malappuram district
Association football midfielders
Gokulam Kerala FC players